The Federal Reserve Bank of Richmond is the headquarters of the Fifth District of the Federal Reserve located in Richmond, Virginia. It covers the District of Columbia, Maryland, North Carolina, South Carolina, Virginia, and most of West Virginia excluding the Northern Panhandle. Branch offices are located in Baltimore, Maryland and Charlotte, North Carolina. Thomas I. Barkin became president of the Richmond Fed following the retirement of Jeffrey M. Lacker in April 2017.
The previous president, J. Alfred Broaddus, retired in 2004.

History and Building

The Federal Reserve Bank of Richmond has had three locations in Downtown Richmond, Virginia. When it opened in 1914, it was located near the federal courts. From 1919 to 1921, a new building for the Federal Reserve was constructed at 100 North Ninth Street. The Fed offices existed here from 1921 until 1978, when they moved to their current location. The old 1921 Fed building is now used as the Supreme Court of Virginia, which moved to the location in 1978 from its former building at 1111 East Broad Street.

The current building has an aluminum facade and was designed by Minoru Yamasaki, who also designed the former World Trade Center. Despite being one of the tallest buildings in the state, 49% of the building's total floor area is located underground. The building was proposed in 1972, and built from 1975 to 1978.

Economy
The Federal Reserve Bank of Richmond is the fourth-largest Federal Reserve Bank by assets held, after New York, San Francisco, and Atlanta, as of December 2018.

Branches
Federal Reserve Bank of Richmond Baltimore Branch Office
Federal Reserve Bank of Richmond Charlotte Branch Office

Board of Directors
The following people serve on the board of directors :

Class A

Class B

Class C

See also

 Federal Reserve Districts
 Federal Reserve Branches
 Federal Reserve Bank of Richmond Baltimore Branch Office
 Federal Reserve Bank of Richmond Charlotte Branch Office
 Federal Reserve System
 Federal Reserve Act
 Structure of the Federal Reserve System

References

External links
Richmond Fed's home page
Historical resources by and about the Federal Reserve Bank of Richmond including annual reports back to 1915

Richmond
Richmond
Bank buildings in Virginia
Skyscrapers in Richmond, Virginia
Skyscraper office buildings in Virginia
Economy of Richmond, Virginia
Economy of the Northeastern United States
Economy of the Southeastern United States
Government buildings completed in 1978
1978 establishments in Michigan
Minoru Yamasaki buildings